William Gibb may refer to:

William Gibb (artist) (1839–1929), Scottish artist
William Gibb (footballer), Scottish footballer
William Gibb (politician) (1882–1952), Australian politician

See also

Gibb (surname)

William Gibbes (disambiguation)
William Gibbs (disambiguation)